Wim Balm (born 24 February 1960) is a retired Dutch footballer.

He played for Haarlem and Twente in his home country, then emigrated to Norway to play for SK Vard Haugesund. Staying in Norway, he later coached the women's team of SK Haugar. .

References

1960 births
Living people
Dutch footballers
HFC Haarlem players
FC Twente players
SK Vard Haugesund players
Norwegian First Division players
Dutch expatriate footballers
Expatriate footballers in Norway
Dutch emigrants to Norway
Association football midfielders
Footballers from Haarlem